Kitepower is a registered trademark of the Dutch company Enevate B.V. developing mobile airborne wind power systems.
Kitepower was founded in 2016 by Johannes Peschel and Roland Schmehl as a university spin-off from the Delft University of Technology’s airborne wind energy research group  established by the former astronaut Wubbo Ockels. 
The company is located in Delft, Netherlands, and currently comprises 18 employees (2018).

System 

Based on its first 20 kW (rated generator power) prototype, Kitepower is currently developing a scaled-up 100 kW system for the purpose of commercialization. Funding was provided by the European Commission's Horizon 2020 Fast Track to Innovation  project REACH in which the company was collaborating with Delft University of Technology and industry partners  Dromec, Maxon Motor and Genetrix.

Working principle 

The Kitepower system consists of three major components: a soft kite, a load-bearing tether and a ground-based electric generator. Another important component is the so-called kite control unit and together with the according control software for remotely steering the kite.

For energy production, the kite is operated in consecutive "pumping cycles" with alternating reel-out and reel-in phases: during reel-out the kite is flown in crosswind maneuvers (transverse to the incoming wind). This creates a large pulling force which unwinds the tether from a ground-based drum connected to a generator. 
In this phase electricity is generated. Once the maximum tether length is reached, the kite is reeled back, but this time depowered, such that it can be retracted with a low aerodynamic resistance. This phase consumes a small fraction of the previously generated power such that in total net energy is produced. The electricity is buffered by a rechargeable battery unit, or, in a kite park configuration, several systems can be operated with phase shifts such that the battery capacity can be reduced.

Technology context 

Airborne wind energy promises to be a cost-competitive solution to existing renewable energy technologies.
The main advantages of the airborne wind energy technology are the reduced material usage compared to conventional wind turbines (no foundation, no tower) which allows reaching for higher altitudes and makes the systems more mobile in terms of location, and considerably cheaper in construction. 
Challenges are robustness and reliability of the flying wind energy system and the airspace requirements of the technology.
A considerable body of scientific literature and patents has been developed.

Applications 

For the art project Windvogel of Dutch artist Daan Roosegaarde the Kitepower system was operated also during night, using a light-emitting tether.  In October 2021 the company deployed its 100 kW system during a 3 weeks exercise of the Dutch engineering corps on the Caribbean Island Aruba.

Awards 
 YES!Delft Launchlab 2016 
 Dutch Defense Innovation Competition 2016 
 YES!Delft Incubation Program 2017

See also 
 List of airborne wind energy organizations
 Crosswind kite power
 Airborne wind turbine
 Wind power

References

External links
 Kitepower Official Website

Renewable energy
Airborne wind power